MV Leinster was launched in 1968 and operated initially for the British and Irish Steam Packet Company (B+I Line). The  5,000-ton ship as built had capacity for 1,200 passengers and 220 cars.
The ship has also been known under several other names including Innisfallen, Chams and Merdif.

History
The ship was built at Verolme Cork Dockyards Ltd., Rushbrooke, County Cork, Ireland. It initially worked for B+I Line on the Dublin to Liverpool route. Leinster had a multi-windows observation lounge deck with cocktail bar above the bridge which could differentiate her from Munster who also worked Dublin-Liverpool.

The  5,000-ton ship as built had capacity for 1,200 passengers and 230 cars. Ships of the class had bow and stern doors allowing a turnaround time of one hour. They were also equipped with bow thrusters and stabilizers.

From 1980 to 1986, the ship was mostly reallocated to the Southern Irish Sea routes variously Cork and Rosslare to Swansea and Pembroke Dock; taking the name Innisfallen from her sister ship.

1986 saw the vessel sold to the Strintzis Lines, Cyprus for operations in the Mediterranean Sea.  In the summer of 1990 she briefly returned to the South Irish Sea on charter to Swansea Cork Ferries and in 1993 she was briefly named Chams for a Tunisia—Genoa charter operation.

In November 2001 the vessel was sold to Marco Shipping Agency, Dubai and renamed Merdif and finally scrapped at Alang, India in 2004.

References

Notes

Footnotes

Sources
 
 
 

1968 ships